Year 1351 (MCCCLI) was a common year starting on Saturday (link will display the full calendar) of the Julian calendar.

Events 
 January–December 
 January 14 – Edward III of England institutes the Treason Act 1351, defining treason in English law. It remains unrepealed into the 21st century.
 February – The Statute of Labourers is enacted by the Parliament of England, to deal with a labour shortage caused by the Black Death.
 March 4 – The Ayutthaya Kingdom is established by King Uthong (Ramathibodi I) in modern-day Thailand. He begins to propagate Theravada Buddhism as the state religion.
 March 23 – Firuz Shah Tughlaq succeeds Mohammad Tughlaq as ruler of the Delhi Sultanate. At this time, the Samma dynasty in Sindh (part of modern-day Pakistan) breaks away from the Sultanate.
 March 26 – War of the Breton Succession: Combat of the Thirty – Thirty chosen knights each, from the Kingdoms of France and England, fight to determine who will rule the Duchy of Brittany; a Franco-Breton victory is assured by the squire Guillaume de Montauban.
 April 8 – Hundred Years' War: Battle of Taillebourg – The French are defeated by the English.
 May 1 – Zürich joins the Old Swiss Confederacy.
 November 26 – Emperor Sukō abdicates as 3rd Emperor of the Northern Court of Japan.

 Date unknown 
 The Red Turban Rebellions break out in China, leading to permanent weakening of the Mongolian-run Yuan dynasty.
 King Gongmin ascends the throne in Goryeo.
 The region of Vantaa in Finland is first mentioned (as Helsinge).

Births 
 October 16 – Gian Galeazzo Visconti, first Duke of Milan (d. 1402)
 November 1 – Leopold III, Duke of Austria (d. 1386)
 Princess Joan of France (d. 1371)
 probable – Władysław II Jagiełło, Grand Duke of Lithuania and King of Poland (d. 1434)

Deaths 
 February 13 – Kō no Morofuyu, Japanese general
 March 20 – Muhammad bin Tughluq, Sultan of Delhi
 March 25 
Kō no Moronao, Japanese samurai
Kō no Moroyasu, Japanese samurai
 May 24 – Abu al-Hasan Ali ibn Othman, Sultan of Morocco (b. 1297)
 June 20 – Margareta Ebner, German nun (b. 1291)
 November 15 – Joanna of Pfirt, duchess consort of Austria

References